Odontodactylus scyllarus, commonly known as the peacock mantis shrimp, harlequin mantis shrimp, painted mantis shrimp, clown mantis shrimp or rainbow mantis shrimp, is a large stomatopod native to the epipelagic seabed across the Indo-Pacific, ranging from Guam to East Africa, and as far South as Northern KwaZulu Natal in South Africa.

In the marine aquarium trade, it is both prized for its attractiveness and considered by others to be a dangerous pest.

Description
They are primarily green with orange legs and leopard-like spots on the anterior carapace.

Their ability to see circularly polarised light has led to studies to determine if the mechanisms by which their eyes operate can be replicated for use in reading CDs and similar optical storage devices.

The dactyl club
The dactyl club is the most electron dense region of the stomatopod exoskeleton. From a transverse cross section, the club can be divided into three different regions: the impact region, the periodic region and the striated region. The mechanical properties of each region has a correlation to the degree of mineralization that is present.

There is a step-like decrease in calcium concentration from the impact region towards the periodic region of the dactyl club, meanwhile the phosphate concentration decreases in a gradient manner. Alongside this the carbon and magnesium concentrations increases in the same region, hence stipulating that the impact region is mainly composed of calcium phosphate while the rest of the club contains a combination of calcium phosphate and calcium carbonate. The impact region has shown to be mainly composed of hydroxyapatite, with a higher degree of crystallinity compared to that found in bovine bone.

Ecology

O. scyllarus is a smasher, with club-shaped raptorial appendages. An agile and active intertidal and sub-intertidal predator, it prefers gastropods, crustaceans, and bivalves, and will repeatedly deliver blunt force to the exoskeleton of its prey until it can gain access to the underlying soft tissue for consumption. The speed of a raptorial appendage's strike causes cavitation bubbles to form. When those bubbles pop they release a large amount of heat, temporarily raising temperatures to near those at the surface of the sun and further weakening the armor of their prey. In addition, the surface of its hammer-claw is made up of extremely dense hydroxyapatite, laminated in a manner which is highly resistant to fracturing, and can break ordinary glass tanks. Its composition is being investigated for potential bionic use in material engineering.

Aquaria
Some saltwater aquarists keep peacock mantis shrimp in captivity. The peacock mantis is especially colourful and desired in the trade.

While some aquarists value peacock shrimp, others consider them harmful pests because they are voracious predators that will eat other desirable inhabitants in the tank.  Some of the largest specimens can break aquarium glass by striking it, and can do further damage by burrowing in live rock.  Live rock with mantis shrimp burrows is considered useful by some in the marine aquarium trade and is often collected. It is not uncommon for a piece of live rock to convey a live mantis shrimp in an aquarium. Once inside the tank, they may feed on fish, shrimps, and other inhabitants. They are notoriously difficult to re-catch once established in a well-stocked tank, and there are accounts of them breaking glass tanks and damaging coral, when they wish to make a home within it.

References

External links

Mantis shrimps could show us the way to a better DVD
 

Stomatopoda
Crustaceans described in 1758
Taxa named by Carl Linnaeus
Edible crustaceans